Thady may refer to:

Thady Connellan (1780–1854), Irish school-teacher, poet and historian
Thady Coughlan (born 1951), former Limerick City Councillor and former Mayor of Limerick
Thady Ryan, Olympic Equestrian chef d'équipe for Ireland during the Summer Olympics of the 1960s
Thady Wyndham-Quin, 7th Earl of Dunraven and Mount-Earl (1939–2011), Irish peer

See also
Thady Quill, popular traditional Irish song